The Italy women's national football team has represented Italy in international women's football since their inception in 1968. The team is controlled by the Italian Football Federation (FIGC), the governing body for football in Italy.

Formed in 1968, Italy took part in various unofficial international tournaments, hosting the first unofficial European Competition in 1969 and World Cup in 1970. Italy qualified for both the first World Cup in 1991, where they reached the quarter-finals, and the first European Championship. While Italy were runners-up in the European Championship in 1993 and 1997, they are yet to replicate similar success at the World Cup. In 2019, after a 20-year drought, Italy qualified for the World Cup where they equaled their previous best performance, reaching the quarter-finals.

History

1968–1984: Early history and unofficial tournaments
The women's national team played its first game on 23 February 1968, in Viareggio against Czechoslovakia. However, the national team was not yet part of the Italian Women's Football Federation, which was founded on 11 March in Viareggio. From the beginning, they took part in various continental and international tournaments in Europe and in the world, also achieving good successes. With the birth of the European Competition for Women's Football (1984), organized by UEFA, and later the Women's World Cup, organized by FIFA, the highest international women's competitions became equivalent to the men's competitions.

After its debut in 1968, the Italy national team took to the field to compete in other non-official international friendlies and tournaments, such as the European Competition in 1969 that saw it win the final over Denmark, the World Cup in 1970 that saw it lose the final against the aforementioned Danish national team, competitions both organized in Italy, and the Mundial in Mexico in 1971 where they achieved third place. In 1979, Italy hosted, and participated in the unofficial European Competition, reaching the final again, which took place at the San Paolo Stadium in Naples, and in which Denmark triumphed again. Between 1981 and 1988 there were five editions of the Mundialito, an international invitation-only tournament, one of the most prestigious events in the women's football scene before the advent of the World Cup. Apart from the first edition in 1981 that was organized in Japan, the next four were organized in Italy, where the Italy national team obtained three victories and two second places overall. The triumphs arrived in 1981, winning the group, in 1984 overcoming West Germany in the final and in 1984 overcoming the United States in the final, while in the other two editions it lost the final against England.

1984–1991: First World Cup and European Championship
In 1984, UEFA organized the first European Competition. Italy won Group 3 of the qualifiers, being one of four teams to qualify for the final round. Italy faced Sweden, being defeated both in the first leg, played at the Flaminio Stadium in Rome in front of 10,000 spectators, and in the return match in Linköping. In 1987, Italy again gained access to the European Competition, winning Group 4 of the qualifiers. In the final stage organized in Norway, Italy were defeated in the semi-final against the host nation, but achieved third place by defeating England, with goals by Carolina Morace and Elisabetta Vignotto. Italy were also confirmed in the 1989 edition, having passed the qualifying phase with a play-off win against France. Italy finished fourth in the tournament, having lost the semi-final against West Germany after a penalty shoot-out, as well as in the third place match against Sweden after extra time.

In the 1991 European Championship, Italy was once again admitted to the four-team finals, after having won the qualifying play-off against the Sweden. In the final tournament, Italy repeated what had happened two years before, losing both the semi-final against the German hosts and the final for third place against Denmark, although even with the fourth-place finish, gained access to the first edition of the World Cup organized by FIFA in the same year. The world championship was organized in China, as Italy was drawn into Group 3 together with Germany, Chinese Taipei and Nigeria. Italy ended the group in second place with two victories against Taipei and Nigeria and a defeat against Germany; all four goals for the team came from Carolina Morace. Italy advanced to the quarter-finals, where they were defeated by Norway 3–2 after extra time.

1993–1999: Twice European Championship runners-up
The 1993 European Championship was hosted in Italy. After defeating England in the final play-off match, Italy overcame Germany in the semi-finals after a penalty shoot-out. In the final, played at the Manuzzi Stadium in Cesena, Italy was defeated 1–0 by Norway. Norway also denied Italy a place at the 1995 European Championship, with a 7–3 aggregate loss in the qualifying play-offs. Consequently, Italy also didn't qualify for the 1995 World Cup.

Italy participated in the 1997 European Championship, with the number of teams participating in the competition increasing from four to eight. In Group B, Italy defeated Norway and drew against Denmark and Germany, still achieving first in the group advancing to the knockout stage. In the semi-final Italy beat Spain 2–1, but in the final, were defeated 2–0 by Germany. In 1998, Italy qualified for the World Championship for the second time. The 1999 edition took place in the United States, with Italy being drawn in Group B along with Brazil, Germany and Mexico. After a 1–1 draw against Germany in the debut match, Italy lost 2–0 to Brazil, and ended the group with a 2–0 victory over Mexico; Italy finishing third in the group and were eliminated.

2000–2011: Decline
With the beginning of the 2000s, a decline in the performance of the Italy national team began. At the 2001 European Championship, Italy, coached by Carolina Morace, were eliminated in the group stage due to a worse goal difference compared to Norway.

Four years later, at the 2005 European Championship, Italy finished last in its group with zero points, losing all three of their matches against Germany, Norway and France, conceding twelve goals overall. Redemption came in the 2009 edition, with Italy defeating both England and Russia, advancing to the knock-out stage as second-placed in the group behind Sweden who had defeated them. In the quarter-finals, Italy faced Germany, where they lost 2–1; Germany would ultimately win their seventh continental title.

Having failed to qualify for the 2003 and 2007 editions of the World Cup, Italy also failed to qualify for the 2011 edition in the intercontinental two-legged play-off between UEFA and CONCACAF. The United States won the first leg 1–0 in Padua with a goal by Alex Morgan in the fourth minute of added time, while they also won the second leg by a score of 1–0 in Bridgeview with a goal by Amy Rodriguez in the first half.

2011–2017: Slim World Cup qualification miss
Italy qualified for the 2013 European Championship in Sweden by winning the qualifying group with nine victories out of ten matches. At the tournament, Italy was drawn in Group A with hosts Sweden, Denmark and Finland. With one win, one draw and one defeat, Italy advanced from the group stage to the quarter-finals in second place, but were defeated 1–0 by Germany.

In the following two years, Italy, led by Antonio Cabrini, was involved in the qualification for the 2015 World Championship: despite eight victories out of ten games, including two record victories against Macedonia (11–0 and 15–0), they finished in second place in Group 2 behind Spain, sending Italy to the play-offs. In the first round of the play-offs, Italy defeated Ukraine 4–3 on aggregate, but were defeated by the Netherlands 3–2 on aggregate in the final round of the play-offs.

Italy qualified for the 2017 European Championship second in its group behind Switzerland. At the European Championship, Italy finished in last place in Group B behind Germany, Sweden and Russia, despite the victory in the third game against Sweden.

2017–present: First World Cup qualification in 20 years

On 8 June 2018, twenty years since their last participation, Italy qualified for the 2019 FIFA World Cup, winning its qualifying group with a game in hand. In the group stage of the tournament, Italy won Group C, recording two victories against Australia (2–1) and Jamaica (5–0), which guaranteed advancement to the knockout stage, with Italy's defeat to Brazil (0–1) irrelevant to the final table. In the round of 16, Italy won 2–0 over China, advancing to the quarter-finals for the second time in their history. However, with a 2–0 defeat to European Champions the Netherlands, Italy's World Cup journey came to an end on 29 June 2019. The following year, Italy advanced to the final of the 2020 Algarve Cup (and the first Algarve Cup final of their history) but Italy had to withdraw the match due to the COVID-19 pandemic in Italy and Germany were declared as winners. In the 2022 Algarve Cup, Italy managed to reach the final again but lost against Sweden 6–5 at the penalty shoot-outs after the 1–1 draw after the extra-time.

However, Italy failed to produce the same form in the UEFA Women's Euro 2022, finishing bottom with only one point and one goal scored, though much blames were taken for the Serie A having not gone professional until the end of the tournament. After that failure, Italy qualified for the 2023 FIFA Women's World Cup by winning two games against Moldova and Romania with the team now fully recognised professional, finishing top of the group in the qualifiers, ahead of Switzerland, which was rather an irony after the men's team fell victim to the same Swiss opponents in the 2022 FIFA World Cup qualifiers.

Results and fixtures

The following is a list of match results in the last 12 months, as well as any future matches that have been scheduled.

Legend

2022

2023

Managerial history

Players

Current squad
The following players were called up for the against Romania on 6 September 2022.Caps, goals and player numbers are correct , after the match against Switzerland.

Recent call ups

Competitive record

FIFA Women's World Cup

UEFA Women's Championship

All-time records

Head-to-head record
Key

The following table shows Italy's all-time official international record per opponent:

Last updated: Italy vs Netherlands, 29 June 2019. Statistics include official FIFA-recognised matches only.

FIFA rankings
Below is a chart of Italy's FIFA ranking from 2003 to the present.

Top scorers

. Highlighted names denote a player still playing or available for selection.

See also
Italy women's national under-23 football team
Italy women's national under-20 football team
Italy women's national under-17 football team
Italy men's national football team
Serie A (women's football)
Sport in Italy

Notes

References

External links

 
FIFA profile

 
European women's national association football teams